Bennie Le Sueur (22 March 1917 – 17 August 1994) was an Australian rules footballer who played for the Footscray Football Club and Collingwood Football Club in the Victorian Football League (VFL).

Notes

External links 

Profile on Collingwood Forever

1994 deaths
1917 births
Australian rules footballers from Victoria (Australia)
Western Bulldogs players
Collingwood Football Club players
Braybrook Football Club players